The 2008 Croatian Figure Skating Championships ( took place between February 16 and 17, 2008 in Zagreb. Skaters competed in the disciplines of men's singles and ladies' singles.

Senior results

Men

Ladies

External links
 results

Croatian Figure Skating Championships
Croatian Figure Skating Championships, 2008